The Spencer family is a fictional family in the CBS Daytime soap opera The Bold and the Beautiful. They were introduced at the beginning of the show with the introduction of media mogul Bill Spencer Sr. until his departure in 1994. Currently, the family is represented by Bill Jr., Liam, Wyatt, Will, Douglas, Kelly, and Beth. The Spencers own and manage the international media conglomerate Spencer Publications.

Family members

First generation
William "Bill" Spencer Sr. (Jim Storm)Patriarch of the Spencer family. Founder, chairman and CEO of Spencer Publications. Father of Caroline Forrester, Karen Spencer, and Bill Spencer Jr.. Bill was known and feared for being extremely ruthless in business and controlling and manipulative with his children. He was a very good friend of Stephanie Forrester, and saw her as his true love, but nothing happened between them because she refused to leave her husband Eric Forrester.

Second generation
Caroline Spencer Sr. (Joanna Johnson)Twin daughter of Bill and Marion Spencer. Raised as an only child, and never knew of her identical twin sister Karen Spencer. Died of leukemia.
Karen Spencer (Joanna Johnson)Twin daughter of Bill and Marion Spencer. She was kidnapped as an infant and taken away to Texas, where she lives as Faith Roberts raised by waitress Bonnie Roberts. Mother of Caroline Spencer. Karen came out as openly gay after years of being forced by her father to hide her true sexuality. Currently 50% owner of Spencer Publications.
William "Bill" Spencer Jr. (Don Diamont)Bill's illegitimate son, born in 1963. Currently CEO and 49% owner of Spencer Publications. He is the father of Wyatt Spencer, Liam Spencer, and Will Spencer.

Third generation
Wyatt Spencer (Darin Brooks)  Son of Bill Spencer Jr. and Quinn Fuller. Former executive of Quinn Artisan Jewelers, and currently works at Spencer Publications. Raised by his mother, he thought his father was dead until he met Hope Logan, who helped uncover that Bill was his father. Wyatt has become known for having many of the traditional Spencer traits.
Caroline Spencer (Linsey Godfrey) Daughter of Karen Spencer, named after Karen's twin sister. New York City socialite, fashion designer at Forrester Creations, and head of the Caroline Spencer Cancer Foundation. She is the mother of Douglas Forrester. Died offscreen of a blood clot. 
William "Liam" Spencer III (Scott Clifton)  Son of Bill Spencer Jr. and his college girlfriend Kelly Hopkins. Raised by his mother and stepfather without knowing his father until his mother died and he discovered, with the help of Hope Logan, that Bill was his father. He is the father of Kelly Spencer and Beth Spencer.
William Logan "Will" Spencer Son of Bill Spencer Jr. and Katie Logan.

Fourth generation
 Douglas Forrester  Son of Caroline Spencer (later adopted by Hope Spencer) and Thomas Forrester.
 Kelly Spencer  Daughter of Liam Spencer and Steffy Forrester.
 Beth Spencer  Daughter of Liam Spencer and Hope Logan. Illegally adopted by Steffy Forrester, who named her Phoebe, but she was eventually reunited with Liam and Hope.

In-laws

Marion Spencer – Bill Sr.'s wife (1961–86)
Margo Maclaine Lynley (Lauren Koslow) – Bill Sr.'s wife (1988–90).
Thorne Forrester (Ingo Rademacher) – Caroline Sr.'s husband (1987–89).
Ridge Forrester (Thorsten Kaye) – Caroline Sr.'s husband (1990); Caroline's husband (2015–16).
Connor Davis (Scott Thompson Baker) – Karen's husband (1994).
Katie Logan (Heather Tom) – Bill's wife (2009–14, 2015–16).
Danielle Spencer (Crystal Chappell) – Karen's wife (1990s—).
Steffy Forrester (Jacqueline MacInnes Wood) – Liam's wife (2011–12, 2013, 2017–18); Wyatt's wife (2016–17).
Hope Logan (Annika Noelle) – Liam's wife (2012, 2018–19, 2020–); Wyatt's wife (2014–15).
Rick Forrester (Jacob Young) – Caroline's husband (2013–15).
Ivy Forrester (Ashleigh Brewer) – Liam's wife (2015).
Brooke Logan (Katherine Kelly Lang) – Bill's wife (2017–18).

Descendants

 Bill Spencer (died 2009); married Marion Spencer (1961–86), Margo Maclaine Lynley (1988–90)
Caroline Spencer (1962–90); Bill and Marion's daughter; twin; married Thorne Forrester (1988–90), Ridge Forrester (1990)
Karen Spencer; Bill and Marion's daughter; twin; married Connor Davis (1994), Danielle Spencer (c1990s–)
Caroline Spencer (1989–2019); Karen's daughter; married Rick Forrester (2013–15), Ridge Forrester (2015–16)
Douglas Forrester (2014 –); Caroline's son with Thomas Forrester
Bill Spencer Jr. (1965–); Bill's son with unknown woman; married Katie Logan (2009–14, 2015–16), Brooke Logan (2017–18)
Wyatt Spencer; Bill Jr.'s son with Quinn Fuller; married Hope Logan (2014–15), Steffy Forrester (2016–17)
Liam Spencer; Bill Jr.'s son with Kelly Hopkins; married Steffy Forrester (2011–12, 2013, 2017–18), Hope Logan (2012, 2018–19, 2020–), Ivy Forrester (2015)
Kelly Spencer (2018–); Liam and Steffy's daughter
Beth Spencer (2019–); Liam and Hope's daughter
Will Spencer (2010–); Bill Jr.'s son with Katie Logan 
 Mark MacClaine; Bill's adopted son with Margo

Spencer Publications
Spencer Publications is an international media conglomerate. It started as one magazine, Eye on Fashion, by Bill Spencer and eventually grew to include numerous businesses as Spencer Publications took control of its own distribution, marketing, and advertising. It diversified and evolved, investigating green printing and with the growth of the Internet took the business into cyberspace.

For years Spencer Publications founder Bill Spencer ruthlessly ran it as chairman and CEO in Los Angeles then in New York City. His two living children, Karen Spencer and Bill Spencer Jr., worked their way up and upon their father's death Karen and Bill each received 50% ownership and were named co-CEO.

Bill's wife Katie Logan became CEO after their divorce papers were signed, Bill gave Katie 1% ownership which made Bill's ownership 49%. Katie combined her 1% with Karen's 50% making Karen the majority stockholder. After Bill reconciled with Katie she signed legal papers naming him CEO again and giving him equal custody of their son Will but Bill revealed it was an act to gain control of Spencer Publications and equal custody of Will. When Katie's sister Brooke discovered Bill's actions she destroyed the papers. Months later after unsuccessfully trying to get Karen and Katie to reinstate Bill as CEO Brooke revealed she still had the papers and gave them to Bill, thus removing Katie as CEO and reinstating Bill as CEO and giving him equal custody of Will.

Personnel
 Karen Spencer (50% shareholder)
 Bill Spencer Jr. (49% shareholder, CEO)
 Wyatt Spencer (executive)
 Katie Logan (1% shareholder, vice president)
 Justin Barber (Executive vice president)
 Alison Montgomery (assistant)
 George Satalino (Patrick John Hurley) (board member)

Former employees
 Bill Spencer Sr. (founder, chairman, and CEO)
 Katie Logan (CEO)
 Liam Spencer (editor of Eye on Fashion, president, acting CEO)
 Wyatt Spencer (president)

Spencer sword necklace
Bill Spencer Jr. wore a sword necklace that was made by a jewelry designer Quinn Fuller and it became a symbol of his determination and ruthlessness. When he discovered that Liam Spencer was his son he had an identical sword necklace made for Liam and it became a family trait for Spencer men to wear a sword necklace. When Hope Logan met Wyatt Spencer in Big Bear she saw that he wore a sword necklace identical to Bill and Liam's. This would reveal that Wyatt is Bill's son.

In November 2009, Bill tells Steffy Forrester the sword is "a physical representation" of himself – never give up, never surrender, achieve a goal let nothing stop him, fight if he has to. 

In November 2018, Bill admits that he initially started wearing his sword necklace as a symbol of protection against his father Bill Spencer, Sr. then to be a warrior and fight on against an enemy.

References 

The Bold and the Beautiful families
Television characters introduced in 1987